Rangsiroj Panpeng or Ek Rangsiroj (born: September 13, 1974 in Amphoe Bang Ban, Ayutthaya Province) is a Thai actor under Channel 7.

Biography & career
Rangsiroj was born in a poor family in Ayutthaya Province. With poverty, he lived at Wat Senasanaram (Senasanaram Temple) as a temple boy at the age of 15. At the age of 18, he began playing music in the pub. During his time as a temple boy, he acts like the other temple boys, such as served the monks while alms-round in the early morning etc., until he graduated at the age of 22–23. And finally into the showbiz with the beginning point from model.

He is often role as manly character, has frequently starred in the dramas of Chalong Pakdeevijit,  as well as in Angkor 2, Thong 9, Sao 5, Suea Sung Fah.

In addition, he is also a songwriter, including singing for dramas on Channel 7.

Filmography
Television dramas

Films

References 

 รังสิโรจน์ พันธุ์เพ็ง ch7.com

External links

1974 births
Living people
Rangsiroj Panpeng
Rangsiroj Panpeng
Rangsiroj Panpeng
Rangsiroj Panpeng
Rangsiroj Panpeng
Rangsiroj Panpeng
Rangsiroj Panpeng